The Miser is a 1990 Italian comedy film directed by Tonino Cervi. It is a loose adaptation of Molière's comedy The Miser.

Plot 
The rich and miserly Don Arpagone lives his days following precise patterns and commanding  his servants and sons. He wants to marry a rich girl named Marianna, but is loved by the boy Valerio, without Arpagone knowing. As if that were not enough, Arpagone, in addition to wanting the inheritance of the new bride, intends to marry his daughter with a rich noble to earn more money.Don Arpagone also has a chest full of gold coins, which he jealously guards because he fears that everybody wants to steal it, including the servants and children in his family. Just when one day Arpagone drops his guard, his young friend Valerio steals the cash coins to marry his beautiful lover ...

Cast 
Alberto Sordi as Arpagone
Laura Antonelli as Frosina
Nicola Farron as Cleante
Anna Kanakis as Elisa
Valérie Allain as Marianna
Miguel Bosé as Valerio
Christopher Lee as Cardinale Spinosi
Marie Laforêt as Contessa Isabella Spinosi
Lucia Bosè as Donna Elvira
Franco Interlenghi as Mastro Giacomo
Carlo Croccolo as Mastro Simone
Nunzia Fumo as Argena
Jacques Sernas as Don Guglielmo 
Mattia Sbragia as Don Oronte

References

External links

1990 films
Films based on works by Molière
Italian films based on plays
Films directed by Tonino Cervi
Commedia all'italiana
1990 comedy films
Films scored by Piero Piccioni
Films based on works by Plautus
1990s Italian films